Matthaios K. Paranikas (1832–1914) was a Greek scholar, philologist teacher and writer of the 19th and early 20th centuries.

Biography 
Paranikas was born in 1832 in Vitsa of Zagori. He successfully graduated from the Zosimaia School of Ioannina, the Philolosophical School of the University of Athens and finished his studies in the University of Munich where he got the Philosophy Teacher degree. From then he became a teacher in many Greek schools of the Ottoman Empire including the Zappeion Greek girls' school of Constantinople, Theological School of Halki and in Madytos. He served as a headmaster in schools of Chalkidona, Adrianople and the famous Evangelical School of Smyrna (1878-1885). He was an early member of the Greek Phlilological Society of Constantinople (Ελληνικός Φιλολογικός Σύλλογος) since 1863 when it was established just in 1861. There he made many historical and philological researches, of which many of them were published in the philological magazine of the society, in the Athenian philological magazines Parnassos and Pandora but as well as in the Ecclesiastical Truth magazine of the Ecumenical Patriarchate.  He served as a headmaster of the Phrontisterion of Trapezous in the periods of 1895-96 and 1903–04, when he retired. He died in 1914 at the age of 71 or 72.

Selected writings 
Σχεδίασμα περί της εν τω ελληνικώ έθνει καταστάσεως των γραμμάτων από Αλώσεως Κωνσταντινουπόλεως (1453 μ.Χ.) μέχρι των αρχών της ενεστώσης (ΙΘ') εκατονταετηρίδος, Constantinople, 1867
Anthologia graeca carminum christianorum, Leipzig, 1871 (in Latin)
Περιήγησις Ανδρέου Λιβαδηνού, 1873
Ιστορία της Ευαγγελικής Σχόλης Σμύρνης [History of the Evangelical School of Smyrna], Athens, 1885

References 

1832 births
1912 deaths
Zosimaia School alumni
National and Kapodistrian University of Athens alumni
Ludwig Maximilian University of Munich alumni
Greek scholars
Greek schoolteachers
Greek philologists
People from Zagori